Harry Alfie Beadle (born 7 January 2003) is an English professional footballer who plays as a defender for  club Colchester United.

Career
Beadle progressed through the Academy at Charlton Athletic prior to signing a professional contract with Colchester United on 4 June 2021.

He made his professional debut on 7 September 2021, starting in Colchester's EFL Trophy match against Gillingham.

Career statistics

References

External links

Living people
2003 births
Footballers from the London Borough of Bexley
English footballers
Association football defenders
Charlton Athletic F.C. players
Colchester United F.C. players